Pycnacantha is a genus of African orb-weaver spiders first described by John Blackwall in 1865.

Species
 it contains four species:
Pycnacantha dinteri Meise, 1932 – Namibia
Pycnacantha echinotes Meise, 1932 – Cameroon
Pycnacantha fuscosa Simon, 1903 – Madagascar
Pycnacantha tribulus (Fabricius, 1781) (type) – Central, South Africa

References

Araneidae
Araneomorphae genera
Spiders of Africa
Taxa named by John Blackwall